Jim Strickland may refer to:

Jim Strickland (baseball) (born 1946), American baseball player
Jim Strickland (politician) (active from 2007), mayor of Memphis, Tennessee